The Premier 15s, currently known for sponsorship purposes as the Allianz Premier 15s, is the top tier of the women's English rugby union domestic league system run by the Rugby Football Union (RFU). The league was created mainly from teams in the Women's Premiership. Its first season began on 16 September 2017. The reigning champions are Saracens Women.

History 
The Premier 15s was founded by the RFU in October 2016 as Women's Super Rugby, where teams involved would have to invest in training facilities and meet increased minimum standards. The RFU will invest millions of pounds in the clubs over the first three seasons to help develop the improved standards. A minimum requirement in the new league included developing a professional coaching resource to support players in training throughout the week.

There will be no promotion/relegation to the Premier 15s during the first two seasons.

Team selection 
When the new league was announced, the RFU announced an independent bidding process for women's teams who wished to run one of the franchises, with the initial plan being for all previous Women's Premiership teams plus two new teams to make up the league. Following the initial 14 clubs making submissions of interest, 12 were invited for an interview at Twickenham Stadium.

In February 2017, the RFU announced the 10 clubs that would partake in the new league. The choice was controversial, as all Women's Premiership teams (Aylesford Bulls Ladies being taken over by Harlequin F.C. and became Harlequins Ladies) were included except for Lichfield Ladies despite their 15-year stint in the top flight of English women's rugby. In their place were clubs that had never participated in the Women's Premiership: Gloucester-Hartpury Women and Loughborough Students (Lightning).

The Lichfield Ladies director of rugby said: " “We're disgusted, disappointed and dumbfounded by the decision." 

A number of high-profile figures also protested at the exclusion of Lichfield including the men's Leicester Tigers and the Conservative MP for Lichfield, Michael Fabricant, said he would challenge it in Parliament, citing the Equality Act 2010 in that the men's English Premiership had 12 teams while the Women's Super League only had 10. 

The champions of Championship 1 South, Thurrock T-Birds also said that they would appeal against their exclusion from the new league: however, both appeals were unsuccessful.

In 2020, Richmond Women and Waterloo Ladies were removed from the league and replaced with Exeter Chiefs Women and Sale Sharks Women, on the grounds that it was felt that the Premier 15s teams needed the support of professional men's clubs to be viable in the long term.

Due to ongoing financial difficulties at Worcester Warriors, University of Worcester Warriors were suspended from the league on 26 September 2022. The suspension was temporarily lifted a month later when it was confirmed that relevant funding and insurance was in place until Christmas 2022.

In December 2022 the RFU announced the make up of side from the 2023/24 season onwards. Darlington Mowden Park Sharks, Sale Sharks, University of Worcester Warriors and Wasps had their applications to continue in the league rejected, while Leicester Tigers (formerly of Championship North 1) and Ealing Trailfinders (formerly of National Challenge 1) joined the league.

Competition 
All teams play a home and away season with the top four teams qualifying for a play-off using the 1v4, 2v3 system. Unusually, for the 2017–18 season, each of the play-offs comprised back-to-back home and away fixtures with the aggregate score across both determining the winner. For the 2018–19 season, the play-offs reverted to the more usual single fixture with the top two teams having home advantage. The two winners play in the final.

Teams and locations

Champions

Finances 
The Premier 15s was launched with an initial £2.4 million three-year investment from the Rugby Football Union.

On 2 August 2017, snack foods company Tyrrells was announced as the league's name sponsor, and the competition name was officially changed to Premier 15s. Tyrells is the competition's first major sponsor, the biggest ever financial investment in women's club rugby. The sponsorship from Tyrrells ended after the 2019/20 season was declared null and void due to COVID-19 pandemic. Following this, insurance giant Allianz were announced as the new principle partner with the competition becoming the Allianz Premier 15s.

Most players in the Premier 15s do not draw a salary from the RFU, other than the 17 players who are part of the England women's national rugby sevens team.

Broadcast 
Some matches are streamed on the Premier 15s website, and Sky TV may also broadcast some games in the first three seasons. For the 2020–21 season, one match per round was broadcast on the RFU YouTube channel or Premier 15s website, with the semi-finals and final also shown on BT Sport. 

Live streaming continued in the 2021–22 season, with over 40 matches to be shown across the season. From November, one match a week has also been streamed on the BBC Sport website and BBC iPlayer, with some matches also available on BBC Red Button. Harlequins v. Wasps on December 27 was also shown on BT Sport as part of a double-header with the Harlequins men's team at Twickenham Stadium.

References

External links 
Premier 15's website

Women's rugby union competitions in England
Rugby union leagues in Europe
Rugby union leagues in England
Professional sports leagues in the United Kingdom